On 8 June 2022 a train collided with an excavator in South Khorasan province, Iran, leaving 22 people dead and 87 others injured. The incident took place 50 kilometres (30 miles) from Tabas as the train travelled from Mashhad to Yazd.

References

2022 in Iran
Derailments in Iran
Railway accidents in 2022
2022 train derailment
June 2022 events in Asia
Excavators